Joshua Finnie (born 18 December 1996) is a New Zealand first-class cricketer. He was part of New Zealand's squad for the 2014 ICC Under-19 Cricket World Cup. In December 2015 he was named as the captain of New Zealand's squad for the 2016 Under-19 Cricket World Cup.

In June 2018, he was awarded a contract with Otago for the 2018–19 season. In June 2020, he was offered a contract by Otago ahead of the 2020–21 domestic cricket season.

See also
 List of Otago representative cricketers

References

External links
 

1996 births
Living people
New Zealand cricketers
Otago cricketers
Place of birth missing (living people)